The Honda Dualnote (also branded as the Acura DN-X) is a hybrid sports car concept that was initially unveiled at Japan's Tokyo Motor Show in 2001.

The Dualnote was powered by a  double overhead camshaft (DOHC) i-VTEC V6 motor with Honda's Integrated Motor Assist electric hybrid system. This engine setup was estimated to produce  while still being capable of fuel efficiency of approximately  (5.6 L/100 km).

References

Dualnote